Chares of Mytilene was a Greek belonging to the court of Alexander the Great. He was appointed court-marshal or introducer of strangers to the king, an office borrowed from the Persian court. He wrote a history of Alexander in ten books, dealing mainly with the private life of the king. The fragments are chiefly preserved in Athenaeus. These fragments are largely concerned with court ceremonies and personal gossip, including a description of Alexander's introduction of the Persian custom of proskynesis to his court.

See Scriptores Rerum Alexandri (pp. 114–120) in the Didot edition of Arrian.

References

External links
Chares of Mitylene in Encyclopaedia Iranica.

Generals of Alexander the Great
Ancient Mytileneans
4th-century BC Greek people
4th-century BC historians
Historians who accompanied Alexander the Great
Year of birth unknown
Year of death unknown